Thomas J Mather (15 August 1908 – 2 February 1982) was a British diver who competed in the 1928 Summer Olympics. Following the 1928 Olympics Mather won a gold medal in the 10 Metres Platform at the 1934 British Empire Games in London.

References

External links
 

1908 births
1982 deaths
British male divers
Olympic divers of Great Britain
Divers at the 1928 Summer Olympics
Divers at the 1934 British Empire Games
Commonwealth Games medallists in diving
Commonwealth Games gold medallists for England
Medallists at the 1934 British Empire Games